Jhantla جھانٹلہ is a village in Tehsil Kharian of Gujrat District, Pakistan. It is located about 150 kilometers from Lahore, 17 kilometers from Kharian. Syed & Awan  is the main tribe of Jhantla. In the southeast of the village there is a small lush green hill which is used as graveyard of the village.

Jhantla is known for its agricultural diversity, different crops including wheat. There is a primary school near the hill and kids have to travel few milles to go to high school in the nearby village.

Every year on 25 June people celebrate summer mela and go to three different shrines to pay their tribute to these holy men; one grave is almost 9 yards in length. Jhantla is basically a small village with a population of about 2000 people and area about 3 km in radius. Jhantla is surrounded by villages like Malka, Malagar, Manglia and Golrahashim.

Jhantla can be reached from Gulyana/ Manglia road or from Kharian road.

Populated places in Gujrat District